TullyOran is a townland nearby Mohill town, county Leitrim, in Ireland. Tullyoran Court Tomb is an ancient megalithic tomb located here.

Townland
Tullyoran is a townland in the Barony of Mohill, in county Leitrim, in Ireland. The land is pasture and meadow with some tillage with trees growing in sheltered locations. The view to the north presents the distant Cuilcagh mountains are visible on the skyline. There is a reported ringfort situated at the centre of the townland. The rock is limestone, light gray, and very fossiliferous.

Court tomb
The ancient "Tullyoran Court tomb" is situated on level pasture land surrounded by drumlins. The remains of this Court tomb are interpreted as having an asymmetrical court with one arm curving out and another arm running straight from the entrance.

The three set stones, on the east, might have been part of a curved line of the court.

Southwards from this entrance are three stones, roughly aligned, which might mark the part of the western arm of a court.

See also

 Mohill
 Monastery of Mohill-Manchan
 Mohill (barony)

References and notes

Notes

Citations

Primary sources

Secondary sources

Archaeological sites in County Leitrim
Townlands of County Leitrim
Conmaicne Maigh Rein